Khatul Anuar bin Md Jalil (born 2 April 1997) is a Malaysian professional footballer who plays as a goalkeeper for Malaysia Super League club Penang.

Club career

Kuala Lumpur City
On 15 April 2018, Khatul made his debut for senior club in a 2–2 draw over Sri Pahang.

UKM (loan)
On 8 January 2019, Khatul joined Malaysia Premier League club UKM on a season-long loan.

Career statistics

Club

Honours
KL City FC
 Malaysia Cup: 2021

UKM
 Malaysia Challenge Cup runner-up: 2019

References

External links
 

1997 births
Living people
People from Alor Setar
Malaysian footballers
Malaysian people of Malay descent
Association football goalkeepers
Malaysia Premier League players
Malaysia Super League players
Kuala Lumpur City F.C. players
UKM F.C. players
Penang F.C. players
Malaysia youth international footballers